Florence Bayard Hilles (1865–1954) was an American suffragist, one of the founders of the National Woman's Party.

Biography 
Hilles was born in 1865, the daughter of Thomas Francis Bayard, a member of the politically prominent Bayard family. She was a munitions worker in World War I, and worked for a time in France following the war's end. After hearing Mabel Vernon speak at the Delaware State Fair in 1913, she joined the suffrage movement. In 1914, Hilles was voted to be the head of the Delaware Congressional Union for Woman Suffrage chapter. During her presidency, division between the Congressional Union and the Delaware Equal Suffrage Association emerged. That year she organized the first parade advocating for women's suffrage in Delaware. Held on May 2 in Wilmington, in conjunction with other parades across the nation, it had over 400 attendees. 

On a 1916 suffrage tour, she was the principal speaker, and in Seattle scattered flyers from a seaplane. In 1917, she was elected to the national board of the National Woman's party. Hilles served as a Silent Sentinel, picketing the White House, leading women in a "Grand Picket" on March 4, 1917. She was the chairwoman of the Delaware branch of the National Woman's Party.

The White House picket continued into July. Sixteen women, including Hilles, Annie Arniel, and Dora Lewis, were arrested on July 14, 1917. sent to Occoquan Virginia Workhouse.

In 1919, she was prominent at the "Watchfire demonstrations". An advocate of the Equal Rights Amendment, she was viewed as one of the most prominent supporters of the amendment. From 1933-1936, she served as the National Chairman of the National Woman's Party. She married William S. Hilles, a lawyer. The Sewall–Belmont House and Museum's library, the Florence Bayard Hilles Research Library (also the oldest Feminist library in the United States) was founded by her. Hilles died in 1954.

In Votes for Delaware Women, scholar Anne M. Boylan describes Hilles as "perhaps the most visible of Delaware's" militant suffragettes.

Personal life 
She married William S. Hilles, a lawyer. Her brother, Thomas F. Bayard Jr., was a US Senator and advocate against women's suffrage.

References

1865 births
1954 deaths
American suffragists
National Woman's Party activists